Les Lilas is a commune in the northern-eastern suburbs of Paris, France.

History 
The commune of Les Lilas (literally "the lilacs") was created on 24 July 1867 by detaching a part of the territory of Romainville and merging it with a part of the territory of Pantin and a part of the territory of Bagnolet.

Heraldry

Population

Transport 
Les Lilas is served by Mairie des Lilas station on Paris Métro Line 11.

Notable residents 
It is the home of the exiled royal family of Montenegro.
It is the birthplace of French actress Maïwenn Le Besco, French actor Marc Ruchmann and violinist Guillaume Latour

In popular culture 
Les Lilas is known for the hit 1958 song by Serge Gainsbourg, "Le Poinçonneur des Lilas", about a ticket puncher at the Porte des Lilas Métro station. This Métro station is actually in Paris, one stop away from the Mairie des Lilas Métro station which is in Les Lilas.

Education 
Primary schools:
 Three public preschool-elementary schools (Calmette, des Bruyères, and Julie-Daubié)
 Three public preschools (Courcoux, Victor-Hugo and Romain-Rolland)
 Four public elementary only schools (Paul-Langevin, Romain-Rolland, Ecole Waldeck-Rousseau, Ecole Victor-Hugo)
 One private elementary school (Ecole Notre-Dame)

Public secondary schools:
Collège Marie Curie
Lycée polyvalent Paul-Robert

There is also a public library, Bibliothèque André-Malraux.

See also
Communes of the Seine-Saint-Denis department

References

External links 

  

Communes of Seine-Saint-Denis